The Rawlings Gold Glove Award, usually referred to as the Gold Glove, is the award given annually to the Major League Baseball players judged to have exhibited superior individual fielding performances at each fielding position in both the National League (NL) and the American League (AL), as voted by the managers and coaches in each league. Managers are not permitted to vote for their own players.  Eighteen Gold Gloves are awarded each year (with the exception of 1957, 1985, 2007 and 2018), one at each of the nine positions in each league. In 1957, the baseball glove manufacturer Rawlings created the Gold Glove Award to commemorate the best fielding performance at each position. The award was created from a glove made from gold lamé-tanned leather and affixed to a walnut base. Initially, only one Gold Glove per position was awarded to the top fielder at each position in the entire league; however, separate awards were given for the National and American Leagues beginning in 1958.

Iván Rodríguez has won the most Gold Gloves at catcher, with 13; all were won with the Texas Rangers or the Detroit Tigers (both American League teams), though Rodríguez has played in both leagues. Johnny Bench, who spent his entire career with the Cincinnati Reds, leads National Leaguers in wins, and is second overall with 10 Gold Gloves. Yadier Molina is third overall and second in the NL all time with nine. Bob Boone, who is a member of one of four family pairs to win Gold Glove Awards, won seven between both leagues during his career. Jim Sundberg has won six Gold Gloves, with Bill Freehan and Salvador Pérez winning five. There have been four 4-time winners at catcher: Del Crandall, Mike Matheny, Charles Johnson, and Tony Peña. Hall of Famers who have won as catchers include Bench, Rodriguez, Carlton Fisk, and Gary Carter. The other family pair to win Gold Gloves as catchers are brothers Bengie and Yadier Molina, who have won eleven awards between them .

Yadier Molina set the record for putouts among winning catchers in 2016; he put out 1,113 batters for the St. Louis Cardinals that season. In the American League, the leader is Dan Wilson, with 1,051 putouts in 1997 though he did not win the Gold Glove Award for it.  Among Gold Glove winners, the most A.L. putouts was in 2012, when Matt Wieters had 994. Assist leaders include Carter (108 in 1980) in the National League and the major leagues and Sundberg (103 in 1977) in the American League. No Gold Glove-winning catchers had posted errorless seasons until Johnson (1997) and Matheny (2003) each accomplished the feat in the National League within six years; their fielding percentages in those seasons were 1.000, and Matheny posted two other winning seasons with only one error and a .999 fielding percentage in his career. Bengie Molina leads in the American League with a one-error, .999 fielding percentage season in 2002; Sherm Lollar also posted only one error in the award's inaugural season, but a reduced number of chances left his fielding percentage at .998. Yadier Molina and Johnson hold the major league record for double plays turned among winners, with 17 each. Edwards doubled off 17 runners in 1964, and Johnson matched his total in 1997. The American League leaders are Ray Fosse and Boone (16 double plays in 1971 and 1986, respectively). Bench holds the record for the least passed balls in a season, having allowed none in 1975. Rodríguez (1999) and Boone (1988) lead the American League, with one allowed. Rodríguez has the highest percentage of baserunners caught stealing, with a 60% mark set in 2001. Bench is the National League leader; he threw out 57% of potential base-stealers in 1969.

Key

American League winners

National League winners

Footnotes
In 1957, Gold Gloves were given to the top fielders in Major League Baseball, instead of separate awards for the National and American Leagues; therefore, the winners are the same in each table.
1965 winner Joe Torre was inducted into the Baseball Hall of Fame for his managerial career.

See also
Gold Glove-winning batterymates

References
General

Inline citations

External links
Rawlings Gold Glove Award Website

Gold Glove Award